In mathematics, a Haefliger structure on a topological space is a generalization of a foliation of a manifold, introduced by André Haefliger in 1970. Any foliation on a manifold induces a special kind of Haefliger structure, which uniquely determines the foliation.

Definition
A codimension- Haefliger structure a topological space  consists of the following data:

 a collection of continuous maps ;

 for 

The cocycle  is also called a Haefliger cocycle.

More generally, piecewise linear, analytic, and continuous Haefliger structures are defined by replacing sheaves of germs of smooth diffeomorphisms by the appropriate sheaves.

Examples and constructions

Pullbacks 
An advantage of Haefliger structures over foliations is that they are closed under pullbacks. As particular cases we obtain the following constructions:

Foliations 

The Haefliger cocycle is defined by

As anticipated, foliations are not closed in general under pullbacks but Haefliger structures are. Indeed, given a continuous map , one can take pullbacks of foliations on  provided that  is transverse to the foliation, but if  is not transverse the pullback can be a Haefliger structure that is not a foliation.

Classifying space

There is a classifying space  for codimension- Haefliger structures which has a universal Haefliger structure on it in the following sense.

References

Differential geometry
Smooth manifolds
Topological spaces
Structures on manifolds
Foliations